Anauktaw may refer to several places in Burma:

Anauktaw, Banmauk
Anauktaw, Budalin
Anauktaw, Mingin